The Horror in the Museum and Other Revisions is a collection of stories revised or ghostwritten by American author H. P. Lovecraft. It was originally published in 1970  by Arkham House in an edition of 4,058 copies. The dustjacket of the first edition features art by Gahan Wilson.

The collection was revised in 1989 by S. T. Joshi adding an introduction by Joshi, correcting the texts and expanding the contents.

In 2007, Del Rey published a trade paperback version with a new introduction by Stephen Jones, and a brief biography of Lovecraft at the end.

The revised version of Lovecraft's revisions includes Henry S. Whitehead's "The Trap" but not the other two stories by Whitehead in which Lovecraft had a hand ("Cassius" and "Bothon"). The revised version also includes two collaborations by Lovecraft with Robert H. Barlow, but not the other tales on which they worked together, of which there are four or five. Sonia Greene's "Four O'Clock" is omitted from the revised version, S.T. Joshi having determined that this tale is not properly a part of the Lovecraft corpus; the story is entirely Sonia's, Lovecraft having simply made a few suggestions as to its prose style.

Contents

Original
The Horror in the Museum and Other Revisions (original 1970 edition) contains the following 21 tales:

 "Lovecraft's 'Revisions'" by August Derleth
 "The Crawling Chaos" with Elizabeth Berkeley
 "The Green Meadow" with Elizabeth Berkeley
 "The Invisible Monster" by Sonia Greene
 "Four O'Clock" by Sonia Greene
 "The Man of Stone" by Hazel Heald
 "Winged Death" by Hazel Heald
 "The Loved Dead" by C. M. Eddy, Jr.
 "Deaf, Dumb, and Blind" by C. M. Eddy, Jr.
 "The Ghost-Eater" by C. M. Eddy, Jr.
 "To All the Seas" by Robert H. Barlow
 "The Horror in the Museum" by Hazel Heald
 "Out of the Eons" by Hazel Heald
 "The Diary of Alonzo Typer" by William Lumley
 "The Horror in the Burying-Ground" by Hazel Heald
 "The Last Test" by Adolphe de Castro
 "The Electric Executioner" by Adolphe de Castro
 "The Curse of Yig" by Zealia Bishop
 "Medusa's Coil" by Zealia Bishop
 The Mound by Zealia Bishop
 "Two Black Bottles" by Wilfred Blanch Talman

Revised

The Horror in the Museum and Other Revisions (revised 1989 edition, designated by the publisher a "corrected third printing") contains the following 26 tales:

 "A Note on the Texts" by S.T. Joshi
 "Lovecraft's 'Revisions'" by August Derleth
 "The Green Meadow" with Elizabeth Berkely 
 "The Crawling Chaos" with Elizabeth Berkely
 "The Last Test" by Adolphe de Castro
 "The Electric Executioner" by Adolphe de Castro
 "The Curse of Yig" by Zealia Bishop
 The Mound by Zealia Bishop
 "Medusa's Coil" by Zealia Bishop
 "The Man of Stone" by Hazel Heald
 "The Horror in the Museum" by Hazel Heald
 "Winged Death" by Hazel Heald
 "Out of the Aeons" by Hazel Heald
 "The Horror in the Burying-Ground" by Hazel Heald
 "The Diary of Alonzo Typer" by William Lumley
 "The Horror at Martin’s Beach" by Sonia H. Greene
 "Ashes" by C. M. Eddy, Jr.
 "The Ghost-Eater" by C. M. Eddy, Jr.
 "The Loved Dead" by C. M. Eddy, Jr.
 "Deaf, Dumb, and Blind" by C. M. Eddy, Jr.
 "Two Black Bottles" by Wilfred Blanch Talman
 "The Trap" by Henry S. Whitehead
 "The Tree on the Hill" by Duane W. Rimel
 "The Disinterment" by Duane W. Rimel
 "'Till A’ the Seas" by R. H. Barlow
 "The Night Ocean" by R. H. Barlow

Notes

References

Short story collections by H. P. Lovecraft
1970 short story collections